Henry Hacking (1750 – 21 July 1831) was an Australian seaman and early explorer in New South Wales. He was responsible for shooting and killing the Aboriginal resistance fighter Pemulwuy in 1802.

Biography
He probably returned to England after the loss of the Sirius in 1790, as he returned to Sydney in the Royal Admiral in 1792.

In March 1799 Henry Hacking was ordered by Governor John Hunter to investigate claims of British sailors being trapped by Aboriginal Australians at the mouth of the Hunter River to the north of the colony. Hacking encountered a group of Awabakal people on the south side of the river, who informed him that the sailors had left earlier on foot, endeavouring to walk back to Sydney. Hacking did not believe them, and became agitated, shooting dead three Awabakal men. The sailors later arrived in Sydney, having walked the distance to return.

Hacking led many hunting expeditions to supplement meat rations for Australia's first settlers. He was among the party that found the lost government cattle at Cowpastures in 1795. He was sentenced to be transported to Norfolk Island in October 1799 for perjury, but received a pardon.

In 1800 and 1801 he piloted the  into and out of Port Jackson. In 1802 Hacking shot and killed Pemulwuy, an Aboriginal resistance fighter and a Bediagal man who had killed and harassed settlers and who since 1790 had been a wanted man.

In 1802 Hacking shot and wounded Ann Holmes, his former mistress, for which crime he was sentenced to death but pardoned in 1803.

In 1804 Hacking was appointed coxswain to the lieutenant-governor at Hobart. In July 1806 he was appointed pilot at Hobart at £50 a year. He died at Hobart on 21 July 1831.

Legacy
Port Hacking, south of Botany Bay, known as Deeban by traditional owners, was named in his honour by Matthew Flinders in 1796.

References

Further reading
 

Settlers of Australia
History of Tasmania
1750 births
1831 deaths
First Fleet